An Area of Outstanding Natural Beauty (AONB; , AHNE) is an area of countryside in England, Wales, and Northern Ireland, that has been designated for conservation due to its significant landscape value.  Areas are designated in recognition of their national importance by the relevant public body: Natural England, Natural Resources Wales, and  the Northern Ireland Environment Agency respectively. In place of AONB, Scotland uses the similar national scenic area (NSA) designation.  Areas of Outstanding Natural Beauty enjoy levels of protection from development similar to those of UK national parks, but unlike national parks the responsible bodies do not have their own planning powers. They also differ from national parks in their more limited opportunities for extensive outdoor recreation.

History
The idea for what would eventually become the AONB designation was first put forward by John Dower in his 1945 Report to the Government on National Parks in England and Wales.  Dower suggested there was need for protection of certain naturally beautiful landscapes that were unsuitable as national parks owing to their small size and lack of wildness. Dower's recommendation for the designation of these "other amenity areas" was eventually embodied in the National Parks and Access to the Countryside Act 1949 as the AONB designation.

Purpose
The purpose of an AONB designation is to conserve and enhance the natural beauty of the designated landscape.

There are two secondary aims: meeting the need for quiet enjoyment of the countryside and having regard for the interests of those who live and work there. To achieve these aims, AONBs rely on planning controls and practical countryside management. As they have the same landscape quality, AONBs may be compared to the national parks of England and Wales. National parks are well known in the UK; by contrast, there is evidence to indicate many residents in AONBs may be unaware of the status. However, the National Association of AONBs is working to increase awareness of AONBs in local communities, and, in 2014, successfully negotiated to have the boundaries of AONBs in England shown on Google Maps.

Statistical overview

There are 46 AONBs in the United Kingdom (33 wholly in England, four wholly in Wales, one that straddles the Anglo-Welsh border and eight in Northern Ireland). The first AONB was designated in 1956 in the Gower Peninsula, South Wales. The most recently confirmed is the Tamar Valley AONB in 1995, although the existing Clwydian Range AONB, covering the Clwydian Range only, was extended in 2012 to form the Clwydian Range and Dee Valley AONB, and the Strangford Lough and Lecale Coast AONBs were merged and redesignated as a single AONB in 2010.

AONBs vary greatly in terms of size, type and use of land, and whether they are partly or wholly open to the public. The smallest AONB is the Isles of Scilly, and the largest is the Cotswolds, . AONB's cover around 15% of England's land area and 4% of Wales'.

Legal status and organisation
AONBs in England and Wales were originally created under the same legislation as the national parks, the National Parks and Access to the Countryside Act 1949. Unlike AONBs, national parks have special legal powers to prevent unsympathetic development. AONBs in general remain the responsibility of their local authorities by means of special committees that include members appointed by a minister and by parishes, and only very limited statutory duties were imposed on local authorities within an AONB by the original 1949 Act. However, further regulation and protection of AONBs in England and Wales was added by the Countryside and Rights of Way (CRoW) Act 2000, under which new designations are now made, 

The government stated in the National Planning Policy Framework (March 2012) that AONBs and national parks have equal status when it comes to planning decisions on landscape issues.  Two of the AONBs (the Cotswolds and the Chilterns), which extend into a large number of local authority areas, have their own statutory bodies, known as conservation boards. The Glover Report in 2019 made various recommendations regarding the future of AONBs but as at 1 November 2020 the government has yet to respond to those recommendations, the report's 'central proposal' having been to bring National Parks and AONBs together as part of one 'family of national landscapes'. However, the Cotswolds Conservation Board announced in September that they were re-styling the area name and it is now known as the Cotswolds National Landscape.

All English and Welsh AONBs have a dedicated AONB officer and other staff. As required by the CRoW Act, each AONB has a management plan that sets out the characteristics and special qualities of the landscape and how they will be conserved and enhanced. The AONBs are collectively represented by the National Association for Areas of Outstanding Natural Beauty (NAAONB), an independent registered charity acting on behalf of AONBs and their partners, which uses the slogan "Landscapes for Life".

AONBs in Northern Ireland was designated originally under the Amenity Lands (NI) Act 1965; subsequently under the Nature Conservation and Amenity Lands (NI) Order 1985.

Threats

There are growing concerns among environmental and countryside groups that AONB status is increasingly under threat from development. The Campaign to Protect Rural England said in July 2006 that many AONBs were under greater threat than ever before. Three particular AONBs were cited: the Dorset AONB threatened by a road plan, the threat of a football stadium in the Sussex Downs AONB, and, larger than any other, a £1 billion plan by Imperial College London to build thousands of houses and offices on hundreds of acres of AONB land on the Kent Downs at Wye. In September 2007 government approval was finally given for the development of a new football ground for Brighton and Hove Albion within the boundaries of the Sussex Downs AONB, after a fierce fight by conservationists. The subsequent development, known as Falmer Stadium, was officially opened in July 2011. The Weymouth Relief Road in Dorset was constructed between 2008 and 2011, after environmental groups lost a High Court challenge to prevent its construction.

Writing in 2006, Professor Adrian Phillips listed threats facing AONBs. He wrote that the apparent big threats were uncertainty over future support for land management, increasing development pressures, the impacts of globalization, and climate change. More subtle threats include creeping sub-urbanization and "horsiculture".

Celebration
Poet Laureate Simon Armitage wrote a poem "Fugitives", commissioned by the National Association of AONBs, which he read on Arnside Knott on 21 September 2019 to launch the celebration of the 70th anniversary of the National Parks and Access to the Countryside Act.

List of Areas of Outstanding Natural Beauty

England

Former Areas
The establishment of the New Forest National Park in 2005 meant the subsumption of South Hampshire Coast AONB into it. East Hampshire and Sussex Downs AONBs were replaced in 2010 by the South Downs National Park.

Wales

Northern Ireland

Notes

Proposed areas in England

The following are formal proposals for new AONBs submitted to Natural England:
Cambs Ouse Valley
Churnet Valley
Forest of Dean
Herefordshire Marches
Northants Ironstone Uplands
Yorkshire Wolds

The 2019 Landscape Review Report additionally favourably mentions proposals not listed in Natural England's list: from Sandstone Ridge and the Vale of Belvoir.

See also
 Conservation in the United Kingdom
 European Landscape Convention
 Landscape-scale conservation
 National parks of England and Wales
 National parks of Northern Ireland
Areas of Outstanding Natural Beauty in Wales

References

External links
 National Association of AONBs website

 

Protected areas of the United Kingdom
Town and country planning in the United Kingdom
AONB